FC Noroc Nimoreni is a women's football club from Nimoreni, Moldova. It competes in the Moldovan Women's Football Championship and won the championship for the first time in 2011–12. The completed the double by winning the national cup also. The team played the qualifying round of the 2012–13 UEFA Women's Champions League. They lost all matches though.

Titles
 3 Championship : 2011–12, 2014–15, 2016-17,
 2 Moldovan Women's Cup : 2011–12, 2013–14

Current squad
 As of 9 August 2015, according to UEFA's website''

Record in UEFA competitions

References

External links
Soccerway profile
Team info at Monenegro FA

Women's football clubs in Moldova
Football clubs in Moldova
Association football clubs established in 2008
2008 establishments in Moldova